Cricklewood sidings currently provides stabling for passenger trains, and is the site of a former steam shed and diesel traction maintenance depot located in Cricklewood, Greater London, England. It is situated beside the Midland Main Line, to the east of Cricklewood station.

The depot code was CW.

Passenger train stabling 

Trains berthing in the stabling roads between services are cleaned and have their water tanks refilled. Train types include East Midlands Railway Class 43 HSTs,  Class 222 Meridians as well as Thameslink Class 700 EMUs.

Domestic waste operations
The North London Waste Authority operates Hendon transfer station, which is located immediately behind the northern end of the site and accessed through the passenger sidings. Freightliner Heavy Haul hauls a waste container train, nicknamed "The Binliner" from here to a landfill site at Calvert in Buckinghamshire.

References

Sources

Railway depots in London
Railway sidings in England
Transport in the London Borough of Barnet